The Grand Canyon Anelopes men's basketball statistical leaders are individual statistical leaders of the Grand Canyon Antelopes men's basketball program in various categories, including points, rebounds, assists, steals, and blocks. Within those areas, the lists identify single-game, single-season, and career leaders. The Antelopes represent Grand Canyon University (GCU) in the NCAA Division I Western Athletic Conference.

GCU began competing in intercollegiate basketball in 1949, the year of its founding, as a member of the National Association of Intercollegiate Athletics (NAIA). GCU did not join the NCAA until 1991, playing in Division II until moving to Division I in 2013. This history is significant because the official recording of statistics began at different times in different organizations, as well as different NCAA divisions. The NAIA record books do not indicate when the organization began officially recording statistics on a national basis, but its current records (as of 2020–21) for single-game and single-season assists were both set in 1972–73, and the career record for blocks dates to 1975. The NCAA has recorded scoring statistics throughout the "modern era" of basketball, which it defines as starting with the 1937–38 season, the first after the center jump after each made field goal was abolished. Individual rebounding was first recorded in 1950–51, as were individual assists. While rebounding has been recorded in every subsequent season, the NCAA stopped recording individual assists after the 1951–52 season. Assists were not reinstated as an official statistic in Division I until the 1983–84 season. By the time GCU joined the NCAA, assists were officially being recorded in Division II, with that practice having started in 1988–89. However, blocks and steals were not recorded in D-II until 1992–93, four seasons after they were first recorded in D-I.

Grand Canyon's record book includes players in all named statistics, regardless of whether they were officially recorded by any of the governing bodies in which the school was a member. That said, the record book does not generally list records from before the 1950s, as records from before this period are often incomplete and inconsistent. Since scoring was much lower in this era, and teams played much fewer games during a typical season, it is likely that few or no players from this era would appear on these lists anyway. These lists are updated through the end of the 2020–21 season.

Scoring

Rebounds

Assists

Steals

Blocks

References

Lists of college basketball statistical leaders by team
Statistical